Guangzhou F.C. is a Chinese professional football club based in Guangzhou. Their first participation in international competitions was during the 2012 season, when they competed in the AFC Champions League. Their first match was against Jeonbuk Hyundai Motors, won by Guangzhou 5–1. 

Guangzhou won the AFC Champions League on two occasions, in 2013 and 2015.

Matches 

All results list Guangzhou's goal tally first.

Key
 (H) = Home
 (A) = Away
 (N) = Neutral

Statistics

By competition

By season

By nation

See also 
Chinese clubs in the AFC Champions League

References 

Guangzhou F.C.
Guangzhou Evergrande Taobao